WHU – Otto Beisheim School of Management is a prestigious German business school with campuses in Vallendar and Düsseldorf, Germany. WHU was founded in 1984 by the Koblenz Chamber of Commerce as the Wissenschaftliche Hochschule für Unternehmensführung; the name was modified in 1993 to honour WHU's benefactor, the businessman Otto Beisheim. As of September 2022, there are 2,082 students (including doctoral students) at WHU, about 243 employees and 59 professors (including assistant professors). WHU is widely regarded as one of the most prestigious business schools in the German-speaking world (DACH).

WHU is known for its master's program in management, which has been favourably ranked by numerous publications. It maintains a global network of more than 220 partner universities, while also offering numerous double degree programs. The school is also well known for its entrepreneurship programs and has the fourth highest number of unicorn-founding alumni in the world.

Study programs 

WHU offers numerous study programs. The language of instruction for the bachelor's program is English or German, while all master's programs are taught entirely in English.
 A three-year program leading to a Bachelor of Science (BSc) in International Business Administration, which includes two mandatory internships and an integrated semester abroad at of WHU's international partner universities
 A three-year program leading to a Bachelor of Science (BSc) in Business Psychology, which includes two mandatory internships and one semester in one of WHU's international partner schools (started in 2022)
 A one-and-a-half-year program leading to a Master of Science (MSc) in Management, consecutive to the Bachelor of Science program
 A one-and-a-half-year program leading to a Master of Science (MSc) in Finance, consecutive to the Bachelor of Science program (started in 2013)
 A one-and-half-year Master of Science (MSc) program in Entrepreneurship, consecutive to the Bachelor of Science program (started in 2017)
 A one-and-half-year Master of Science (MSc) program in International Business (started in 2021)
A one-and-half-year Master of Arts (MA) part-time program in Management (started in 2021)
 A full-time MBA Program, which includes studies at the Kellogg School of Management, the Indian Institute of Management, Bangalore and the China Europe International Business School
 A part-time MBA program
 A global online MBA program
 The Kellogg-WHU Global Executive MBA Program in partnership with the Kellogg School of Management at Northwestern University in the United States
 A doctoral program, leading to the German PhD equivalent Dr. rer. pol.
 Executive Education (customized programs for companies and open general management programs)

Tuition and selection process 
The tuition fee per academic year 2023/2024 for WHU's undergraduate students is €15,800 for those who are citizens of EEA countries and Switzerland, and €25,900 for citizens of non-EEA countries. The tuition fee for the Master of Science in management, finance and entrepreneurship programs are €28,300 for the 90 credit track and €34,800 for the 120 credit track. Scholarships, tuition waivers and financial aid schemes are available for eligible students.

The selection process for the undergraduate programmes consists of two separate parts. Students are preselected according to their academic and personal achievements and are offered a chance to compete for one of the roughly 240 seats per year at the final selection day. During that day, candidates deliver presentations, are interviewed by representatives of the private business sector and undergo an analytical IQ Test.

Accreditations 
All WHU degree programs are recognized by the German state and accredited by the Foundation for International Business Administration Accreditation (FIBAA). In addition, WHU holds accreditations from the Association to Advance Collegiate Schools of Business (AACSB) and from the European Quality Improvement System (EQUIS). Together with ESMT Berlin, the Frankfurt School of Finance & Management and the University of Mannheim, WHU is one of only four German business schools to be accredited by both the AACSB and EQUIS.

Rankings 

WHU's master's program in management was Germany's top-ranked program for nine years in the last decade by the Financial Times, including for five consecutive years between 2013 and 2017. The Economist ranked WHU third worldwide in its inaugural Master in Management ranking published in 2017. In 2019, Times Higher Education ranked WHU third worldwide in its Master in Management ranking. As of 2021, WHU's placement and career services departments have been ranked among the top two worldwide for the twelfth time in a row by the Financial Times' Masters in Management rankings. WHU has maintained the first position in Germany in every Master in Management ranking published by The Economist and QS till date.

In 2020, the Financial Times ranked WHU first in Germany for all its programs: MBA, Master in Management, Executive MBA, and Master in Finance. In the list of business schools with the most unicorn-founding alumni, WHU is placed fourth globally, tying with INSEAD, behind Harvard Business School, the Stanford Graduate School of Business and the Wharton School. According to the BYU PhD ranking that tracks alumni publications in 12 leading accounting journals, the doctoral program placed fifth worldwide in the Managerial Accounting category. WHU's SCM Group ranked first in Germany and sixth globally for Supply Chain Management empirical research in 2020 according to the SCM Journal List ranking.

As of 2020, WHU's joint Executive MBA program with the Kellogg School of Management has been placed first in Germany for the twelfth time in a row by Financial Times. In the recent edition of the EMBA ranking from the Financial Times published in 2022, WHU has, continuing its streak since 2003, ranked at #1 in Germany for the Kellogg-WHU Executive MBA Program. In The Economist ranking of EMBA programs in 2020, the joint Kellogg-WHU EMBA Program ranked first in Germany for the fourth time in a row and fourth worldwide.

Faculty
The faculty at WHU is organized into six groups: Finance and Accounting, Economics, Entrepreneurship, Management, Marketing and Sales, and Supply Chain Management. As of September 2022, there are 41 full professors and 18 assistant professors at WHU who teach at the undergraduate and graduate levels and contribute to the business school's research output.

The faculty includes the following centers: WHU Asia Center, Biopharma Management Center, Center for Collaborative Commerce, Center for Controlling & Management, Entrepreneurship Center, Center for European Studies, Center of Asset and Wealth Management, Center for Sports and Management, Financial Accounting and Tax Center, Henkel Center for Consumer Goods, Center for Market-Oriented Corporate Management, Center for Responsible Leadership and Wipro Center for Business Resilience.

Student body 
WHU student clubs

Students at WHU founded a large variety of student clubs. Among them are the conferences of the "Campus for..." - series:

 WHU – Campus for Finance
 WHU – Campus for Supply Chain Management
 WHU – Campus for Controlling
 WHU – Campus for Strategy and Leadership
 WHU – Campus for Marketing
 WHU – Campus for Sales
 WHU – Campus for Corporate Transformation (although part of the "WHU Campus for" series of conferences, the WHU CCT conference was not a student initiative, but was organized by Serden Özcan, Chairholder of the Otto Beisheim Endowed Chair of Innovation and Corporate Transformation at WHU)

Further student clubs are:

 3 Day Startup
 BusinessMeetsTech
 WHU Charity Concerts
 confluentes
 Diversity & LGBT at WHU
 Enactus WHU
 Entrepreneurship Roundtable
 FEM. - The WHU Female Leadership Initiative
 forumWHU
 WHU Music Club
 WHU Sports Club (HSSV)
 IdeaLab!
 In Vino Veritas
 RCDS at WHU (Ring of Student Christian Democrats)
 SAIDIA Consulting
 SensAbility
 SmartUp!
 Start-Up Academy (by Jugend gründet & WHU)
 WHU Students' Theater Group
 TEDx WHU
 Tradity meets WHU
 Vallendar Integration Program (VIP)
 WHU Finance Society e.V.
 WHU Debate Society
 WHU Euromasters
 WHU Family Business Club
 WHU First Responder
 WHU GenerationsCup
 WHU Golf
 WHU Inside Business - video magazine
 WHU MBA Consulting Club
 WHU Social Democratic and Ecological Association (Fostering socio-political awareness at WHU)
 WHU Students Help e.V.
 WHU Walks for Charity
 WHU Women in Business

Notable people

Honorary professors 
 Paul Achleitner
 Horst Albach
 David B. Audretsch
 Andreas Barckow
 Klaus Brockhoff
 Horst G. Carus
 Edgar Ernst
 Karl-Ludwig Kley
 Dirk Krüger
 Hartmut Leser
 Edgar Löw
 Peter May
 Bolko von Oetinger
 John Onto
 Jürgen Ringbeck
 Klaus Rose
 Hanno Sowade
 Axel Wieandt

Alumni 
 Birgit Bohle, CEO of DB Fernverkehr
 Thomas Buberl, CEO of Axa Group
 Julian Deutz, CFO of Axel Springer, diploma
 Robert Gentz, founder and board member of Zalando, diploma 2007
 Armin Grossklaus, CFO of ATC Group / Oklahoma City, Detroit, US
 Michael Haenlein, professor at ESCP Europe, diploma 1999
 Jan Heitmann, poker player
 Andreas Herrmann, professor at University of St. Gallen
 Christoph Israng, German diplomat
 Philipp Justus, managing director of Google Germany, Austria and Switzerland
 Ulrich Lichtenthaler, German economist
 Matthias Muck, Professor at University of Bamberg
 Andreas Nick, Member of the Bundestag (German parliament), diploma 1990, PhD 1994
 Matthias J. Rapp, CFO of TÜV SÜD AG
 Thorsten Reitmeyer, former CEO of Comdirect bank
 Dominik Richter, founder and CEO of HelloFresh
 Oliver Samwer, CEO of Rocket Internet, diploma
 Christoph Schweizer, CEO-Elect of The Boston Consulting Group (BCG)
 David Schneider, founder and board member of Zalando, diploma 2007
 Stephan Schubert, founder OnVista
 Margret Suckale, board member of BASF, EMBA
 Marco Vietor, founder audibene
 Axel Wieandt, German bank manager
 Saygin Yalcin, founder and CEO of SellAnyCar.com
 Oliver Zipse, board member of BMW, EMBA 1997

References

External links 
 WHU homepage
 Spiegel Business School Rankings 2005
 Alumni organisation

Business schools in Germany
Private universities and colleges in Germany
Universities and colleges in Rhineland-Palatinate
Educational institutions established in 1984
1984 establishments in West Germany
Mayen-Koblenz
Education in Düsseldorf